Mark Isaacs (born 22 June 1958, London) is an Australian classical and jazz composer and pianist. 

Isaacs has also composed and conducted music for film and television.

Discography

Filmography
A Tale of Two Cities (1984)
The Adventures of Robin Hood (1985)
Kidnapped (1986)
Ivanhoe (1986)
Rob Roy (1987)
Don Quixote of La Mancha (1987)
Black Beauty (1987)
The Wind in the Willows (1988)
The Black Arrow (1988)
Alice in Wonderland (1988)
The Corsican Brothers (1989)
G.P. (1989-1990) (34 episodes)
Goldilocks and the Three Bears (1991)
The Pied Piper of Hamelin (1992)
The New Adventures of William Tell (1992)
The New Adventures of Robin Hood (1992)
Mark Isaacs Symphony No.1: Queensland Symphony Orchestra (2014)

Awards and nominations

AIR Independent Music Awards
The AIR Awards (or Jägermeister Independent Music Awards) give awards for independent albums in various categories.

Albert H. Maggs Composition Award
The Albert H. Maggs Composition Award is a commission-based Australian classical composition award. It is administered by the University of Melbourne and is awarded annually in August.

ARIA Music Awards
The ARIA Music Awards is an annual awards ceremony that recognises excellence, innovation, and achievement across all genres of Australian music. They commenced in 1987. 

! 
|-
| 2007
| Resurgence
|rowspan="2"| Best Jazz Album
| 
| 
|-
| 2009
| Tell It Like It Is (as Mark Isaacs Resurgence Band)
| 
|

Art Music Awards
The Art Music Awards are presented each year by the Australasian Performing Right Association (APRA AMCOS) and the Australian Music Centre (AMC).

Australia Council Fellowship
Australia Council Fellowships of $80,000 support outstanding, established artists’ and arts workers’ activity and professional development for a period of up to two years.

Other activities

Lifeline Australia
Isaacs is a volunteer telephone counsellor at Lifeline Australia, the nationwide crisis support and suicide prevention service.

References

External links
Mark Isaacs website

Living people
1958 births
Australian musicians
Australian classical pianists
Male classical pianists
Australian jazz pianists
Australian composers
21st-century classical pianists
Winners of the Albert H. Maggs Composition Award
21st-century Australian male musicians
21st-century Australian musicians